Hydroxybenzotriazole (abbreviated HOBt) is an organic compound that is a derivative of benzotriazole.  It is a white crystalline powder, which as a commercial product contains some water (~11.7% wt as the HOBt monohydrate crystal). Anhydrous HOBt is explosive.

It is mainly used to suppress the racemization of single-enantiomer chiral molecules and to improve the efficiency of peptide synthesis.

Use in peptide synthesis

Automated peptide synthesis involves the condensation of the amino group of protected amino acids with the activated ester. HOBt is used to produce such activated esters. These esters are insoluble (like the N-hydroxysuccinimide esters) and react with amines at ambient temperature to give amides.

HOBt is also used for the synthesis of amides from carboxylic acids aside from amino acids.  These substrates may not be convertible to the acyl chlorides. For instance amide derivatives of ionophoric antibiotics have been prepared in this way.

Safety
Due to reclassification as UN0508, a class 1.3C explosive, hydroxybenzotriazole and its monohydrate crystal are no longer allowed to be transported by sea or air as per 49CFR (USDOT hazardous materials regulations). However, UNECE draft proposal ECE/TRANS/WP.15/AC.1/HAR/2009/1 has been circulated to UN delegates and, if implemented, would amend current regulations thus allowing for the monohydrate crystal to be shipped under the less-stringent code of UN3474 as a class 4.1 desensitized explosive.

References

Peptide coupling reagents
Benzotriazoles
Biochemistry
Reagents for biochemistry
Biochemistry methods
Hydroxylamines